Watson Spring may refer to:

Watson Spring (Georgia)
Watson Spring (Oregon County, Missouri)